The 2002 London Marathon was the 22nd running of the annual marathon race in London, United Kingdom, which took place on Sunday, 14 April. The elite men's race was won by Khalid Khannouchi of the United States in a time of 2:05:38 hours and the women's race was won by home athlete Paula Radcliffe in 2:18:56. Khannouchi's time was a marathon world record, improving on his own record by four seconds. Radcliffe was also close to a world record, just nine seconds off the time set by Catherine Ndereba the previous year.

In the wheelchair races, Britain's David Weir (1:39:44) and Britain's Tanni Grey-Thompson (2:22:51) won the men's and women's divisions, respectively - with Grey-Thompson winning for the sixth time.

Around 99,000 people applied to enter the race, of which 46,083 had their applications accepted and 33,297 started the race. A total of 32,536 runners finished the race, comprising 24,768 men and 7768 women.

Results

Men

Women

Wheelchair men

Wheelchair women

References

Results
Results. Association of Road Racing Statisticians. Retrieved 2020-04-18.

External links

Official website

2002
London Marathon
Marathon
London Marathon